William Michael Rossetti (25 September 1829 – 5 February 1919) was an English writer and critic.

Early life
Born in London, Rossetti was a son of exiled Italian scholar Gabriele Rossetti and his wife Frances Rossetti née Polidori; he was the brother of Maria Francesca Rossetti, Dante Gabriel Rossetti and Christina Georgina Rossetti.

Career

He was one of the seven founder members of the Pre-Raphaelite Brotherhood in 1848, and became the movement's unofficial organizer and bibliographer. He edited the Brotherhood's literary magazine The Germ which published four issues in 1850. Rossetti wrote the poetry reviews for this magazine.

It was William Michael Rossetti who recorded the aims of the Pre-Raphaelite Brotherhood at their founding meeting in September 1848:

To have genuine ideas to express;
To study Nature attentively, so as to know how to express them;
To sympathize with what is direct and serious and heartfelt in previous art, to the exclusion of what is conventional and self-parading and learned by rote;
And most indispensable of all, to produce thoroughly good pictures and statues.

Although Rossetti worked full-time as a civil servant, he maintained a prolific output of criticism and biography across a range of interests from Algernon Swinburne to James McNeill Whistler. He edited the diaries of his maternal uncle John William Polidori (author of The Vampyre and physician to Lord Byron), a comprehensive biography of D. G. Rossetti, and edited the collected works of D. G. Rossetti and Christina Rossetti.

Rossetti edited the first British edition of the poetry of Walt Whitman, which was published in 1868; however, this edition was bowdlerized.
Anne Gilchrist, who became one of the first to write about Whitman, first read his poetry from Rossetti's edition, and Rossetti helped initiate their correspondence.

William Michael Rossetti was a major contributor to the 1911 edition of the Encyclopædia Britannica; his contributions on artistic subjects were criticised by many reviewers at the time and since, as showing little evidence of having absorbed the mounting body of work by academic art historians, mostly writing in German. Below is a quotation from his article on Fra Angelico demonstrating his literary and art-historical style:
The "pietistic" quality of Fra Angelico's work is in fact its predominant characteristic. The faces of his figures have an air of rapt suavity, devotional fervency and beaming esoteric consciousness, which is intensely attractive to some minds ... the faces becoming sleek and prim, with a smirk of sexless religiosity which hardly eludes the artificial or even the hypocritical; because of this, there are some who are not moved by his work. Even so, Fra Angelico is a notable artist within his sphere..

Personal life

In 1874 he married Lucy Madox Brown, daughter of the painter Ford Madox Brown. They honeymooned in France and Italy. Their first child, Olivia Frances Madox, was born in September 1875, and her birth was celebrated in an ode of Swinburne's. A son, Gabriel Arthur, was born in February 1877, followed by another daughter, Helen Maria, in November 1879, and twins, Mary Elizabeth and Michael Ford, in April 1881. Rossetti and his wife did not have the children baptized, nor were they raised in a Christian household. The children were schooled at home by their mother and governesses.

Their son Michael died in infancy.  In 1897, Olivia married an Italian anarchist refugee, Antonio Agresti. They later moved to Italy, where Olivia became a translator and writer. After she was widowed in 1926, she became an associate of Ezra Pound, and the two corresponded frequently. Gabriel Arthur, known as Arthur to the family, became a scientist, married Dora Lewis, and had several children. Helen became a painter of miniatures, and in 1903 married Gastone Angeli.  He was in fragile health and died only a few months later. Helen gave birth to his posthumous daughter, Imogen Lucy, in 1904. In 1903, Helen and Olivia also published A Girl Among the Anarchists under the pseudonym 'Isabel Meredith'; the novel is a fictional recounting of their experiences in the anarchist movement.

William Michael Rossetti died on the 5th February 1919 and is buried in the Rossetti family grave on the west side of Highgate Cemetery. In the grave he joined his father, mother, Elizabeth Siddal (wife of his brother Dante) and his sister Christina. The ashes of his son Gabriel Arthur Maddox were interred in the grave in 1932 and three other members of the Rossetti family have also been buried there subsequently.

Partial bibliography
Rossetti, W. M. (1850). The Germ: thoughts towards nature in poetry, literature, and art. London: Aylott & Jones.
Rossetti, W. M. (1869). Essays on early Italian and German books of Courtesy. London: Trübner.
Rossetti, W. M. (1876). Walt Whitman. London: s.n.
Rossetti, W. M. (1878). Lives of famous poets from Chaucer to Longfellow: with lists of minor poets whose biographies are not included. [S.l.]: Ward.
Rossetti, W. M. (1880). American poetry: a representative collection of the best verse by American writers. London: Ward, Lock.
Rossetti, W. M. (1886). Memoir of Percy Bysshe Shelley. London: Slark.
Rossetti, W. M. (1889). Dante Gabriel Rossetti as designer and writer. London: Cassell & Company, limited.

See also

References

Further reading
 Dinah Roe: The Rossettis in Wonderland. A Victorian Family History. Haus Publishing, London 2011, .
 Angela Thirlwell. William and Lucy: The Other Rossettis. Yale University Press, New Haven/London 2003, .
 Julie L'Enfant. William Rossetti's Art Criticism: The Search for Truth in Victorian Art. University Press of America; .

External links 

 
 
 Oscar Wilde, Joseph Worcester and the Arts & Crafts Movement with a "sonnet" by Rossetti establishing the principles behind the Pre-Raphaelite movement.
 The Pre-Raph Pack Discover more about the artists, the techniques they used and a timeline spanning 100 years.
William Michael Rossetti Papers, John Rylands Library, Manchester
William Michael Rossetti Collection. General Collection, Beinecke Rare Book and Manuscript Library.

1829 births
1919 deaths
English people of Italian descent
Polidori-Rossetti family
Writers from London
People educated at King's College School, London
English male journalists
People associated with the Pre-Raphaelite Brotherhood
Burials at Highgate Cemetery
Victorian writers
19th-century English non-fiction writers
Rossetti family
Translators of Dante Alighieri